Scylla is a monster from Greek mythology traditionally located at today's town of Scilla, Calabria.

Scylla may also refer to:

 Scylla (crustacean), a genus of swimming crabs including the economically important Scylla serrata
 Scylla (database), a NoSQL database
 Scylla (daughter of Nisus), a princess of Megara, a figure from Greek mythology unrelated to the monster
 Scylla (Gatti), an opera first performed in the Paris Opera in 1701
 Scylla (Hugo), a character from the Hugo franchise, and an evil witch who is hungry for power
 Scylla (mountain), a summit in California
 Scylla Mountain, a summit in British Columbia
 Scylla (Prison Break episode), Prison Breaks season four premiere
 HMS Scylla, a number of ships of the British Royal Navy
 Siege of Scylla, two sieges of the fortress of Scilla, Calabria, in July 1806 and January 1808
 Operation Scylla, a 1943 Italian naval operation in the Second World War
 155 Scylla, an asteroid
 Henry David "Hank" Levy aka "Doc" aka "Scylla" a character in the Marathon Man and Brothers novels and the Marathon Man film
 A band fronted by Toni Halliday
 Titanus Scylla, a Kaiju character from the 2019 film  King of the Monsters

See also
Scilla (disambiguation)
Silla (name)
Sillah
Sylla